Brown Valley  is a rectangular ice-covered valley between Mount Kauffman and Mount Kosciusko in the northeast end of the Ames Range, Marie Byrd Land. It was mapped by the United States Geological Survey from surveys and from U.S. Navy air photos, 1959–65, and named by the Advisory Committee on Antarctic Names after Thomas I. Brown, United States Antarctic Research Program meteorologist at Byrd Station in 1963.

References
 

Valleys of Antarctica
Landforms of Marie Byrd Land
Ames Range